This was the first edition of the tournament, Carsten Ball and Dustin Brown won the title beating Dean O'Brien and Ruan Roelofse in the final 3–6, 6–3, [10–6].

Seeds

Draw

References
 Main Draw

Las Vegas Challenger - Doubles
Las Vegas Challenger